Clemensstraße is a 1.76-kilometer-long street in Munich's Schwabing district. The street, named after Clemens August of Bavaria (1700–1761), labeled under the term Green Axis Schwabing is a participative model project for all Munich municipalities and Munich's longest bicycle road.

Course 
The Clemensstraße starts at Leopoldstraße, crosses Belgradstraße and Schleißheimer Straße and turns into Saarstraße at Winzererstraße. While in the area between Münchner Freiheit and Wilhelmstraße, relatively small shops line the street initially, Clemensstraße becomes predominantly a residential street. Until 2002, Clemensstraße 33 housed the Staatliche Fachakademie für Fotodesign München, which was founded on 15 October 1900, as the Lehr- und Versuchsanstalt für Photographie (teaching and research institution for photography). In the area of Belgradstraße, on both sides of the street are numerous restaurants to be found, especially in the summer months their free play areas shape the overal impression of the road. With several decades old traditions, such as the "X-Bar" as well as the, for example, from 1972 to 1976 by Heppel & Ettlich conducted "Jennerwein". Also located there, in Clemensstraße 61, was the "Clemensburg" as Munich's only BVB pub, which existed from 1907 to 2015. In the further course to the east, the Clemensstraße is again primarily a residential street. In the Clemensstraße 113/IV is the Säkularinstitut Ancillae Sanctae Ecclesiae. At the corner of Clemensstraße and Winzererstraße is the Landesarbeitsgericht München (Munich Labor Court).

Historical buildings 
Its design is mainly due to the expansion of the city after the incorporation of Schwabing in 1890 to Munich and the city expansion competition of 1892 under Theodor Fischer. Overall, the Clemensstraße has 36 historically protected monuments by the Bavarian State Office for the Preservation of monuments, of which 26 are in Schwabing-West and 10 in Schwabing.

Famous residents 
1884/85, the former Schwabing Hospital was built in Clemensstraße 33. In the spring of 1900, the stove and oven manufacturer Friedrich Wamsler, whose sons were among the founding members, gave FC Bayern Munich a fenced plot of land on Clemensstraße as a venue, until 1907 when he moved to Leopoldstraße and Parzivalplatz Here the first Munich City Derby also took place on 21 September 1902.

From 1906 to 1910, Alexander Roda Roda lived in Clemensstraße 2. From 1917 to 1919 Ret Marut lived in Clemensstraße 84 /III and led the editorship of Der Ziegelbrenner ("The Brick Burner") there.

From autumn 1967, Edgar Hilsenrath lived in the Clemensstraße 28. Rainer Werner Fassbinder and Juliane Lorenz lived in Clemensstraße 76, as well as Alexander Koester who lived on Clemensstraße (while his studio was on Leopoldstraße). Jochen Winter lived on Clemensstraße.

References

External links 

Streets in Munich
Buildings and structures in Munich
Historicist architecture in Munich